The 34th Kerala Film Critics Association Awards, honouring the best Malayalam films released in 2010, were announced in February 2011.

Winners

Main Awards
 Best Film: Khaddama
 Best Director: Kamal (Khaddama)
 Best Actor: Mammootty (Pranchiyettan and the Saint)
 Best Actress: Kavya Madhavan (Khaddama)
 Second Best Film: Makaramanju
 Second Best Actor – Male: Biju Menon (Various films)
 Best Supporting Actor – Female: Samvrutha Sunil (Various films)
 Best Debut Director: Vinod Mankara (Karayilekku Oru Kadal Dooram), Martin Prakkat (Best Actor)
 Best Story: Mohan Raghavan (T. D. Dasan Std. VI B)
 Best Screenplay: Ranjith (Pranchiyettan and the Saint)
 Best Music Director: M. Jayachandran (Karayilekku Oru Kadal Dooram)
 Best Lyricist: Kaithapram Damodaran Namboothiri (Holidays, Neelambari)
 Best Male Playback Singer: Shankar Mahadevan (Holidays)
 Best Female Playback Singer: Shreya Ghoshal (Aagathan)
 Most Popular Film: Janakan, Shikkar
 Best Cinematographer: Madhu Ambat (Adaminte Makan Abu, Gramam)
 Best Debutant Artist – Female: Karthika (Makaramanju), Ann Augustine (Elsamma Enna Aankutty)
 Best Debutant Artist – Male: Vijay Yesudas (Avan)
 Best Editing: Ranjan Abraham (Elsamma Enna Aankutty)

Special Jury Awards
 Special Jury Award – Direction: R. Sukumaran (Yugapurushan)
 Special Jury Award – Direction: G. Ajayan (Bodhi)
 Special Jury Award – Acting: Salim Kumar (Adaminte Makan Abu)

Honourary Awards 
 Chalachitra Ratnam Award: K. S. Sethumadhavan
 Chalachitra Prathibha Award: Jagannatha Varma, Bichu Thirumala, Santhakumari

References

External links
 "List of recipients of the Kerala Film Critics Association Awards" (in Malayalam)

2010 Indian film awards
2010